Laëtitia Parage (born 5 July 1980) is a former French female canoeist who won at senior level the Wildwater Canoeing World Championships.

References

External links
 Laetitia Parage championne du monde de descente 

1980 births
Living people
French female canoeists